Tom Mardirosian (born December 14, 1947) is an American actor. He is known for playing Agamemnon Busmalis in the HBO show Oz and Agt. Kristos Koutris in the HBO show The Wire.

Mardirosian was born and raised in Buffalo, New York, the son of Armenian parents Afro (née Karahos) and Matthew Mardirosian. In the army, he was a member of a Special Forces troop, where he first started developing his love for acting. After his army service he appeared in numerous productions in Buffalo, and was taught acting at The Studio ARENA Theatre School. He appeared on Broadway at the Cort Theatre in The Magic Show as Goldfarb.

Mardirosian is strongly involved with the Armenian General Benevolent Union (AGBU) within New York City. His brother is the actor and writer Oliver Clark.

Filmography

Film

Television

Videogames

References

External links

1947 births
American male film actors
Living people
Male actors from Buffalo, New York
American people of Armenian descent
Ethnic Armenian male actors
20th-century American male actors
21st-century American male actors
American male stage actors
American male video game actors
American male television actors